Oklahoma City FC is an American women's soccer team, founded in 2007. The team is a member of the Women's Premier Soccer League, the second tier of women's soccer in the American soccer pyramid.

The team plays its home games at Lakeview Field in Yukon, Oklahoma.

References

External links
 Official Site
 WPSL Official Site

Women's Premier Soccer League teams
Women's soccer clubs in Oklahoma
Soccer clubs in Oklahoma City
2007 establishments in Oklahoma
Association football clubs established in 2007